Princess Adelheid of Schaumburg-Lippe (9 March 1821 – 30 July 1899) was a member of the House of Schaumburg-Lippe and a Princess of Schaumburg-Lippe by birth. Through her marriage to Friedrich, Duke of Schleswig-Holstein-Sonderburg-Glücksburg, Adelheid was a sister-in-law of Christian IX of Denmark and Duchess consort of Schleswig-Holstein-Sonderburg-Glücksburg from 14 October 1878 to 27 November 1885.

Family
Adelheid was the second-eldest daughter of  George William, Prince of Schaumburg-Lippe and Princess Ida of Waldeck and Pyrmont. Adelheid was a younger sister of Adolf I, Prince of Schaumburg-Lippe.

Marriage and issue
Adelheid married Prince Friedrich of Schleswig-Holstein-Sonderburg-Glücksburg (later Duke of Schleswig-Holstein-Sonderburg-Glücksburg), the second-eldest son of Friedrich Wilhelm, Duke of Schleswig-Holstein-Sonderburg-Glücksburg and Princess Louise Caroline of Hesse-Kassel, on 16 October 1841 in Bückeburg, Schaumburg-Lippe. Friedrich and Adelheid had five children:

Princess Marie Karoline Auguste Ida Luise of Schleswig-Holstein-Sonderburg-Glücksburg (27 February 1844 – 16 September 1932), married Prince William of Hesse-Philippsthal-Barchfeld.
Friedrich Ferdinand Georg Christian Karl Wilhelm, Duke of Schleswig-Holstein (12 October 1855 – 21 January 1934).
Princess Luise Karoline Juliane of Schleswig-Holstein-Sonderburg-Glücksburg (6 January 1858 – 2 July 1936), married George Victor, Prince of Waldeck and Pyrmont.
Princess Marie Wilhelmine Luise Ida Friederike Mathilde Hermine of Schleswig-Holstein-Sonderburg-Glücksburg (31 August 1859 – 26 June 1941).
Prince Albrecht Christian Adolf Karl Eugen of Schleswig-Holstein-Sonderburg-Glücksburg (15 March 1863 – 23 April 1948).

Ancestry

References

External links 

1821 births
1899 deaths
People from Bückeburg
House of Lippe
Princesses of Schaumburg-Lippe
Princesses of Schleswig-Holstein-Sonderburg-Glücksburg
Daughters of monarchs